is one of the eight titles in Japanese professional shogi.

The word also refers to the piece called the "King" in shogi.

History

The tournament was first held in 1950 as a non-title tournament. The following year in 1951, it was elevated to major title status as the third major title along with the Meijin and Tenth Dan (later Ryūō) title tournaments.

Format

The tournament is open to all  and takes place in four stages. The first and second preliminary rounds consist of multiple single-elimination tournaments in which the first round winners advance to compete against each other in the second round. The three winners of the second round tournaments then advance to a round-robin league called the "" along with four seeded players. The winner of the challenger league then advances to a best-of-seven championship match against the reigning Ōshō title holder. If two players or more finish tied for first in the challenger league, a single-game playoff between the two highest seeded players is held to determine the challenger. The time controls are three hours per player for the two preliminary rounds, four hours per player for the challenger league, and eight hours per player for the championship match. The championship match is held from January to March.

Winners

The following is a list of the winners and runners-up for past Ōshō title matches.

Records
 Most titles overall: Yasuharu Oyama, 20
 Most consecutive titles: Yasuharu Oyama, 9 in a row (1963-1971)

Lifetime Ōshō 

 is the title given to a player who has won the championship ten times. An active player may qualify for the title, but it is only officially awarded upon retirement or death. Yasuharu Oyama and Yoshiharu Habu are the only players who have qualified for this title: Oyama qualified in 1973 and Habu qualified for the title in 2007.

Parallel in amateur shogi

The winner is awarded the title .

References

External links 
Mainichi Shimbun: Ōshō tournament 
Sports Nippon: Shogi 
Shogi Tournament Database: Ōshō tournament 

Shogi tournaments